Stig Henry Johansson (born 26 July 1945 in Forsa, Hälsingland, Sweden) is a Swedish trotting trainer and former driver. He started his career as a professional trainer in 1969, and has during a large part of the career been a dominating force in Swedish trotting. He is, arguably, the greatest in Swedish trotting history. Internationally, he is regarded as one of the sport's great. Among the horses he has trained are top trotters Victory Tilly, Queen L., Peace Corps, Napoletano, Digger Crown, The Onion and Utah Bulwark. Together with these and other horses, Johansson has won numerous major races, including Elitloppet (six times), Gran Premio della Lotteria (four times), Nat Ray Trot (once) and Prix d'Amérique (once).

In December 2005, Johansson announced his decision to quit driving races, but to continue train trotters. The same evening, he drove his last race. He won 6,222 races during 42 years as a driver.

Johansson has won more than 7,000 races as a trainer, second most in Swedish trotting history behind Olle Goop. In December 2008, Johansson passed SEK700 million (~US$87.1 million) won as a trainer.

References

External links

 www.stigh.se - official site

1945 births
Living people
People from Hudiksvall Municipality
Swedish harness racers
Sportspeople from Gävleborg County